Shantang Street (Suzhou Wu: Se daon ka), also known as Seven-mile Shantang, is a street in northwestern Gusu District, Suzhou, Jiangsu, China. The street connects Changmen in the east with Huqiu in the west, with a total length of about 3,829.6 meters (2.38 miles), or a little more than seven li or traditional "Chinese miles". Due to the great history and events involving Shantang Street it is sometimes stated as being the "First Street in Shuzou".

In 2015, the Shantang Street Scenic Area was added to the list of China's "National Historic and Cultural Streets".

History

Construction of the Shantang Canal started in 825 AD, during the Tang Dynasty by Bai Juyi, a poet and the Cishi (modern-day equivalent of the prefectural governor) of Suzhou, to provide a link between Huqiu and the city. The sludge that was dug out from the construction formed a dam along the north bank of the canal known as Baigong Dam in honor of Bai Juyi. A street was then built on the dam, which later became the modern-day Shantang Street.

Along with Pingjiang Road, the street was declared a Historical and cultural block of China in 2015.

Today, it is a popular tourist destination with visitors being attracted by the heritage nature of the buildings and the various old stone bridges.

References

External links
苏州山塘街 - Official site 
Suzhou Shantang Street - Official English site
Suzhou Shantang Kunqu Opera House - Mildchina

Gusu District
Tourist attractions in Suzhou
History of Suzhou
Geography of Suzhou